David Maulana (born 25 February 2002 in Sei Rotan, Percut Sei Tuan, Deli Serdang Regency) is an Indonesian professional footballer who plays as a midfielder for Liga 1 club Bhayangkara.

Club career

Bhayangkara
He signed a contract with Bhayangkara to play in Liga 1 in the 2022 season. David made his league debut on 24 July  2022 in a match against Persib Bandung at the Wibawa Mukti Stadium, Cikarang.

International career
David was part of the Indonesia U17 team that won the 2018 AFF U-16 Youth Championship and the Indonesia U19 team that finished third in 2019 AFF U-19 Youth Championship.

Career statistics

Club

Notes

Honours

International
Indonesia U16
 Thien Phong Plastic Cup: 2017
 JENESYS Japan-ASEAN U-16 Youth Football Tournament: 2017
 AFF U-16 Youth Championship: 2018
Indonesia U19
 AFF U-19 Youth Championship third place: 2019

Individual
 JENESYS Japan-ASEAN U-16 Youth Football Tournament Best Player: 2017

References

External links
 David Maulana at Soccerway
 David Maulana at Liga Indonesia

Living people
2002 births
People from Deli Serdang Regency
Sportspeople from North Sumatra
Indonesian footballers
Association football midfielders
PSMS Medan players
PS Barito Putera players
Bhayangkara F.C. players
Liga 1 (Indonesia) players
HNK Rijeka players
NK Pomorac 1921 players
Indonesia youth international footballers
Indonesian expatriate footballers